Jihadism is a neologism which is used in reference to "militant Islamic movements that are perceived as existentially threatening to the West" and "rooted in political Islam." It has been applied to various insurgent Islamic extremist, militant Islamist, and terrorist individuals and organizations whose ideologies are based on the Islamic notion of jihad. It has also been applied to various Islamic empires in history, such as the Umayyad Caliphate and the Ottoman Empire, who extensively campaigned against non-Muslim nations in the name of jihad.

Contemporary jihadism mostly has its roots in the late 19th- and early 20th-century ideological developments of Islamic revivalism, which further developed into Qutbism and related Islamist ideologies during the 20th and 21st centuries. The Jihadist ideologues envisioned Jihad as a "revolutionary struggle" against the secular international order to unite the Muslim World under the "rule of God". The Islamist volunteer organisations which participated in the Soviet–Afghan War of 1979 to 1989 reinforced the rise of jihadism, which has been propagated during various armed conflicts throughout the 1990s and 2000s.

Gilles Kepel has diagnosed a specific Salafist form of jihadism within the Salafi movement of the 1990s. Jihadism with an international, pan-Islamist scope is also known as global jihadism. Studies show that with the rise of ISIL/ISIS/IS/Daesh, some Muslims from Western countries like Albania, Australia, Belgium, Bosnia and Herzegovina, Canada, Denmark, France, Germany, Ireland, Italy, Kosovo, the Netherlands, New Zealand, North Macedonia, Norway, Poland, Russia, Spain, Sweden, Switzerland, the United Kingdom, and the United States traveled to join the global jihad in Syria and Iraq.

Terminology

The term "jihadism" has been in use since the 1990s, more widely in the aftermath of the 9/11 attacks. It was first used by the Indian and Pakistani mass media, and by French academics who used the more exact term "jihadist-Salafist". Historian David A. Charters defines "jihadism" as "a revolutionary program whose ideology promises radical social change in the Muslim world.. [with]  a central role to jihad as an armed political struggle to overthrow ‘‘apostate’’ regimes, to expel their infidel allies, and thus to restore Muslim lands to governance by Islamic principles."

David Romano has defined his use of the term as referring to "an individual or political movement that primarily focuses its attention, discourse, and activities on the conduct of a violent, uncompromising campaign that they term a jihad". Following Daniel Kimmage, he distinguishes the jihadist discourse of jihad as a global project to remake the world from the resistance discourse of groups like Hezbollah, which is framed as a regional project against a specific enemy.

Most Muslims do not use the term, disliking the association of illegitimate violence with a noble religious concept, and instead prefer the use of delegitimising terms like "deviants".

The term "jihadist globalism" is also often used in relation to jihadism. Academic Manfred Steger proposes an extension of the term "jihadist globalism" to apply to all extremely violent strains of religiously influenced ideologies that articulate the global imaginary into concrete political agendas and terrorist strategies (these include al-Qaeda, Jemaah Islamiyah, Hamas, and Hezbollah, which he finds "today's most spectacular manifestation of religious globalism").

"Jihad Cool" is a term for the re-branding of militant jihadism as fashionable, or "cool", to younger people through consumer culture, social media, magazines, rap videos, toys, propaganda videos, and other means. It is a subculture mainly applied to individuals in developed nations who are recruited to travel to conflict zones on jihad. For example, jihadi rap videos make participants look "more MTV than Mosque", according to NPR, which was the first to report on the phenomenon in 2010. To justify their acts of religious violence, jihadist individuals and networks resort to the nonbinding genre of Islamic legal literature (fatwa) developed by jihadi-Salafist legal authorities, whose legal writings are shared and spread via the Internet.

Maajid Nawaz, founder and chairman of the anti-extremism think tank Quilliam, defines jihadism as a violent subset of Islamism: "Islamism [is] the desire to impose any version of Islam over any society. Jihadism is the attempt to do so by force."

History

Key influences

The term “jihadism” has been applied to various Islamic empires in history, such as the Arab Umayyad Caliphate and the Ottoman empire, who extensively campaigned against non-Muslim nations in the name of jihad.

Islamic extremism dates back to the early history of Islam with the emergence of the Kharijites in the 7th century CE. The original schism between Kharijites, Sunnīs, and Shīʿas among Muslims was disputed over the political and religious succession to the guidance of the Muslim community (Ummah) after the death of the Islamic prophet Muhammad. From their essentially political position, the Kharijites developed extreme doctrines that set them apart from both mainstream Sunnī and Shīʿa Muslims. Shīʿas believe ʿAlī ibn Abī Ṭālib is the true successor to Muhammad, while Sunnīs consider Abu Bakr to hold that position. The Kharijites broke away from both the Shīʿas and the Sunnīs during the First Fitna (the first Islamic Civil War); they were particularly noted for adopting a radical approach to takfīr (excommunication), whereby they declared both Sunnī and Shīʿa Muslims to be either infidels (kuffār) or false Muslims (munāfiḳūn), and therefore deemed them worthy of death for their perceived apostasy (ridda).

Sayyid Qutb, an Egyptian Islamist ideologue and a prominent leader of the Muslim Brotherhood in Egypt, was an influential promoter of the Pan-Islamist ideology during the 1960s. When he was executed by the Egyptian government under the regime of Gamal Abdel Nasser, Ayman al-Zawahiri formed Egyptian Islamic Jihad, an organization which seeks to replace the government with an Islamic state that would reflect Qutb's ideas about the Islamic revival that he yearned for. The Qutbist ideology has been influential among jihadist movements and Islamic terrorists who seek to overthrow secular governments, most notably Osama bin Laden and Ayman al-Zawahiri of al-Qaeda, as well as the Salafi-jihadi terrorist group ISIL/ISIS/IS/Daesh. Moreover, Qutb's books have been frequently been cited by Osama bin Laden and Anwar al-Awlaki.

Sayyid Qutb could be said to have founded the actual movement of radical Islam. Unlike the other Islamic thinkers who have been mentioned above, Qutb was not an apologist. He was a prominent leader of the Muslim Brotherhood and a highly influential Islamist ideologue, and the first to articulate these anathemizing principles in his magnum opus Fī ẓilāl al-Qurʾān (In the shade of the Qurʾān) and his 1966 manifesto Maʿālim fīl-ṭarīq (Milestones), which lead to his execution by the Egyptian government. Other Salafi movements in the Middle East and North Africa and Salafi movements across the Muslim world adopted many of his Islamist principles.

According to Qutb, the Muslim community (Ummah) has been extinct for several centuries and it has also reverted to jahiliyah (the pre-Islamic age of ignorance) because those who call themselves Muslims have failed to follow the sharia law. In order to restore Islam, bring back its days of glory, and free the Muslims from the clasps of ignorance, Qutb proposed the shunning of modern society, establishing a vanguard which was modeled after the early Muslims, preaching, and bracing oneself for poverty or even bracing oneself for death in preparation for jihad against what he perceived was a jahili government/society, and the overthrow of them. Qutbism, the radical Islamist ideology which is derived from the ideas of Qutb, was denounced by many prominent Muslim scholars as well as by other members of the Muslim Brotherhood, like Yusuf al-Qaradawi.

Islamic revivalism and Salafism (1990s to present)

According to Rudolph Peters, scholar of Islamic studies and the history of Islam, contemporary traditionalist Muslims "copy phrases of the classical works on fiqh" in their writings on jihad; Islamic modernists "emphasize the defensive aspect of jihad, regarding it as tantamount to bellum justum in modern international law; and the contemporary fundamentalists (Abul A'la Maududi, Sayyid Qutb, Abdullah Azzam, etc.) view it as a struggle for the expansion of Islam and the realization of Islamic ideals."

Some of the earlier Islamic scholars and theologians who had profound influence on Islamic fundamentalism and the ideology of contemporary jihadism include the medieval Muslim thinkers Ibn Taymiyyah, Ibn Kathir, and Muhammad ibn ʿAbd al-Wahhab, alongside the modern Islamist ideologues Muhammad Rashid Rida, Sayyid Qutb, and Abul A'la Maududi. Jihad has been propagated in modern fundamentalism beginning in the late 19th century, an ideology that arose in the context of struggles against colonial powers in North Africa at that time, as in the Mahdist War in Sudan, and notably in the mid-20th century by Islamic revivalist authors such as Sayyid Qutb and Abul Ala Maududi.

The term jihadism (earlier Salafi jihadism) has arisen in the 2000s to refer to the contemporary jihadi movements, the development of which was in retrospect traced to developments of Salafism paired with the origins of al-Qaeda in the Soviet–Afghan War during the 1990s. Jihadism has been called an "offshoot" of Islamic revivalism of the 1960s and 1970s. The writings of Sayyid Qutb and Mohammed Abdul-Salam Farag provide inspiration. The Soviet–Afghan War (1979–1989) is said to have "amplified the jihadist tendency from a fringe phenomenon to a major force in the Muslim world." It served to produce foot soldiers, leadership and organization. Abdullah Yusuf Azzam provided propaganda for the Afghan cause. After the war, veteran jihadists returned to their home countries, and from there would disperse to other sites of conflict involving Muslim populations, such as Algeria, Bosnia, and Chechnya, creating a "transnational jihadist stream." Some examples are:

 Kashmir conflict (Lashkar-e-Taiba; 1990–present)
 Somali Civil War (1991–present)
 Algerian Civil War (1991–2002)
 Bosnian war (Bosnian mujahideen; 1992–1995)
 Afghan civil war (Taliban; 1994–present)
 East Turkestan irredentism (East Turkestan Islamic Movement; 1997–present)
 Chechen war and Insurgency in the North Caucasus (Arab Mujahideen in Chechnya; 1994–2017)
 Nigerian Sharia conflict (Boko Haram; 2001–present)
 Insurgency in the Maghreb (2002–present)
 Iraqi insurgency (Islamic State of Iraq; 2003–present)
 Al-Qaeda insurgency in Yemen (Abyan Governorate; 2010–present)
 Syrian Civil War (Al-Nusra Front to Protect the Levant; 2011–present)
 Syrian Civil War (Islamic State of Iraq and the Levant; 2013–present)

An explanation for jihadist willingness to kill civilians and self-professed Muslims on the grounds that they were actually apostates (takfīr) is the vastly reduced influence of the traditional diverse class of ulama, often highly educated Islamic jurists. In "the vast majority" of Muslim countries during the post-colonial world of the 1950s and 1960s, the private religious endowments (awqāf) that had supported the independence of Islamic scholars and jurists for centuries were taken over by the state. The jurists were made salaried employees and the nationalist rulers naturally encouraged their employees (and their employees' interpretations of Islam) to serve the rulers' interests. Inevitably, the jurists came to be seen by the Muslim public as doing this.

Into this vacuum of religious authority came aggressive proselytizing, funded by tens of billions of dollars of petroleum-export money from Saudi Arabia. The version of Islam being propagated (Saudi doctrine of Wahhabism) billed itself as a return to pristine, simple, straightforward Islam, not one school among many, and not interpreting Islamic law historically or contextually, but as the one, orthodox "straight path" of Islam. Unlike the traditional teachings of the jurists, who tolerated and even celebrated divergent opinions and schools of thought and kept extremism marginalized, Wahhabism had "extreme hostility" to "any sectarian divisions within Islam".

Shia jihad
The term jihadist is almost exclusively used to describe Sunni extremists. One example is Syria, where there have been thousands of foreign Muslim fighters engaged in the civil war, for example, non-Syrian Shia are often referred to as "militia", and Sunni foreigners as "jihadists" (or "would-be jihadists"). One who does use the term "Shia jihad" is Danny Postel, who complains that "this Shia jihad is largely left out of the dominant narrative." Other authors see the ideology of "resistance" (Arabic: muqawama) as more dominant, even among extremist Shia groups. For clarity, they suggest use of the term "muqawamist" instead.

Beliefs
According to Shadi Hamid and Rashid Dar, jihadism is driven by the idea that jihad is an "individual obligation" (fard ‘ayn) incumbent upon all Muslims. This is in contrast with the belief of Muslims up until now (and by contemporary non-jihadists) that jihad is a "collective obligation" (fard al-kifaya) carried out according to orders of legitimate representatives of the Muslim community. Jihadist insist all Muslims should participate because (they believe) today's Muslim leaders are illegitimate and do not command the authority to ordain justified violence.

Evolution of jihad

Some observers have noted the evolution in the rules of jihad—from the original "classical" doctrine to that of 21st-century Salafi jihadism. According to the legal historian Sadarat Kadri, during the last couple of centuries, incremental changes in Islamic legal doctrine (developed by Islamists who otherwise condemn any bid‘ah (innovation) in religion), have "normalized" what was once "unthinkable". "The very idea that Muslims might blow themselves up for God was unheard of before 1983, and it was not until the early 1990s that anyone anywhere had tried to justify killing innocent Muslims who were not on a battlefield."

The first or the "classical" doctrine of jihad which was developed towards the end of the 8th century, emphasized the "jihad of the sword" (jihad bil-saif) rather than the "jihad of the heart", but it contained many legal restrictions which were developed from interpretations of both the Quran and the Hadith, such as detailed rules involving "the initiation, the conduct, the termination" of jihad, the treatment of prisoners, the distribution of booty, etc. Unless there was a sudden attack on the Muslim community, jihad was not a "personal obligation" (fard ‘ayn); instead it was a "collective one" (fard al-kifaya), which had to be discharged "in the way of God" (fi sabil Allah), and it could only be directed by the caliph, "whose discretion over its conduct was all but absolute." (This was designed in part to avoid incidents like the Kharijia's jihad against and killing of Caliph Ali, since they deemed that he was no longer a Muslim). Martyrdom resulting from an attack on the enemy with no concern for your own safety was praiseworthy, but dying by your own hand (as opposed to the enemy's) merited a special place in Hell. The category of jihad which is considered to be a collective obligation is sometimes simplified as "offensive jihad" in Western texts.

Scholars like Abul Ala Maududi, Abdullah Azzam, Ruhollah Khomeini, leaders of al-Qaeda and others, believe that defensive global jihad is a personal obligation, which means that no caliph or Muslim head of state needs to declare it. Killing yourself in the process of killing the enemy is an act of Shuhada (martyrdom) and it brings you a special place in Heaven, not a special place in Hell; and the killing of Muslim bystanders (nevermind Non-Muslims), should not impede acts of jihad. Military and intelligent analyst Sebastian Gorka described the new interpretation of jihad as the "willful targeting of civilians by a non-state actor through unconventional means." Al-Qaeda's splinter groups and competitors, Jama'at al-Tawhid wal-Jihad and the Islamic State of Iraq and Syria, are thought to have been heavily influenced by a 2004 work on jihad entitled Management of Savagery (Idarat at-Tawahhush), written by Abu Bakr Naji and intended to provide a strategy to create a new Islamic caliphate by first destroying "vital economic and strategic targets" and terrifying the enemy with cruelty to break its will.

Islamic theologian Abu Abdullah al-Muhajir has been identified as one of the key theorists and ideologues behind modern jihadist violence. His theological and legal justifications influenced Abu Musab al-Zarqawi, al-Qaeda member and former leader of al-Qaeda in Iraq, as well as several other jihadi terrorist groups, including ISIL and Boko Haram. Zarqawi used a 579-page manuscript of al-Muhajir's ideas at AQI training camps that were later deployed by ISIL, known in Arabic as Fiqh al-Dima and referred to in English as The Jurisprudence of Jihad or The Jurisprudence of Blood. The book has been described by counter-terrorism scholar Orwa Ajjoub as rationalizing and justifying "suicide operations, the mutilation of corpses, beheading, and the killing of children and  non-combatants". The Guardians journalist Mark Towsend, citing Salah al-Ansari of Quilliam, notes: "There is a startling lack of study and concern regarding this abhorrent and dangerous text [The Jurisprudence of Blood] in almost all Western and Arab scholarship". Charlie Winter of The Atlantic describes it as a "theological playbook used to justify the group's abhorrent acts". He states:

Clinical psychologist Chris E. Stout also discusses the al Muhajir-inspired text in his essay, Terrorism, Political Violence, and Extremism (2017). He assesses that jihadists regard their actions as being "for the greater good"; that they are in a "weakened in the earth" situation that renders Islamic terrorism a valid means of solution.

Opponents
As part of their commitment to restore an Islamic state that implements Sharia (Islamic law), Jihadists are opposed to all forms secular governance: be it democracy, communism, Ba'athism, nationalism as well as all types of non-Muslim political orders.

Against Ba'athism

Syria 
Islamic opposition to Ba'ath party rule developed soon after the 1963 coup which transformed Syria into a one-party socialist state. Throughout the 1960s, the opposition organized protests across Syrian towns and villages backed by conservative segments of the society supported by the ulemah over socio-economic marginalisation and anti-religious policies of the neo-Ba'ath elite. The Syrian branch of the Muslim Brotherhood emerged as the biggest faction of the opposition during this period. After a series of internal purges, General Hafez al-Assad emerged as the uncontested leader of the Ba'ath party and the state in 1970, and established a personalist dictatorship centered around sectarian loyalty to al-Assad family. The increasing visibility of Alawite dominance and clan favoritism led to rising resentment and eventually resulted in the Islamic uprisings of 1976-1982. The "Islamic Front", a coalition of Islamist organizations led by the Syrian Muslim Brotherhood played a major role in the spread of uprisings across all Syrian cities and declared Jihad (holy war) to overthrow the Ba'ath regime. Al-Talia (The Fighting Vanguard) led by Adnan Uqlah was a major Islamist organisation that participated in the Jihad. The uprisings were brutally crushed in the 1982 Hama massacre which resulted in 20,000-40,000 deaths.

During the 2011 Syrian Revolution, the Muslim Brotherhood played a key role in the anti-Assad protests alongside the secular opposition and was also influential within the Free Syrian Army. Foreign volunteers began entering Syria in 2012 to topple the Assad regime and Jihadists made large inroads into regime-held territories in 2013. Al-Nusra Front was one of the largest Jihadist factions in the Syrian Civil War, and carried out large-scale attacks against the Ba'athist military and government officers during its insurgency between 2012 and 2016.

Iraq 
As early as 1980s, Jihadist leader Usama Bin Laden delivered sermons attacking Iraqi dictator Saddam Hussein, condemning him as an apostate and denounced Ba'athist Iraq as an "atheist regime" that pursued hegemonic ambitions in the Gulf region. According to Bin Laden's Islamist worldview, “Socialists are infidels wherever they are”. In 2003, United States invaded and occupied Iraq, after falsely accusing Saddam Hussein of having links to Al-Qaeda. Resentment amongst Sunnis over their marginalisation after the fall of Ba'athist regime led to the rise of Jihadist resistance which resulted in the Al-Qaeda led insurgency in Iraq.

De-Ba'athification policy initiated by the new government led to rise in support of Jihadists and remnants of Iraqi Ba'athists started allying with Al-Qaeda in their common fight against the US. Iraq war journalist George Packer writes in The Assassins' Gate:"The Iraq War proved some of the Bush administration’s assertions false, and it made others self-fulfilling. One of these was the insistence on an operational link between Iraq and al-Qaeda... after the fall of the regime, the most potent ideological force behind the insurgency was Islam and its hostility to non-Islamic intruders. Some former Baathist officials even stopped drinking and took to prayer. The insurgency was called mukawama, or resistance, with overtones of religious legitimacy; its fighters became mujahideen, holy warriors; they proclaimed their mission to be jihad."

Against Communism 

During the Soviet-Afghan war in the 1980s, Muslims across the World were encouraged by the Gulf States, Egypt, Pakistan, Morocco, Jordan and various pro-Western Arab nations for a jihad to defeat the communist invaders in Afghanistan. The United States and allies supported Islamist revolutionaries to the defeat the threat posed by "godless communism", supplying the Afghan Mujahidin with money, equipment and training. Hundreds of thousands of Mujahideen volunteers were recruited from various countries, including Egypt, Pakistan, and Saudi Arabia. Following the overthrowal of the communist regime and dissolution of U.S.S.R, many foreign Jihadists that coalesced under the transnational networks of Al-Qaeda organisation began viewing their struggle as part of a "Global Jihad", eventually pitting them towards a collision course with the United States in the 1990s.

Against Shīʿa Islamists 

After the outbreak of the 2011 Syrian Revolution, the popular rebellion against Assad regime transformed into a sectarian civil war; wherein Sunni Islamist factions of the insurgency became pitted against the Iran-backed Shīʿa militias fighting on the side of regime. In Egypt, the Muslim Brotherhood called for jihad against the Syrian government and allied Iranian proxies, accusing Hezbollah of launching a "sectarian war" by backing Bashar al-Assad. Saudi Arabia also supported various Jihadist factions against the Assad regime, viewing the fight as part of its wider proxy conflict with Iran. Sunnī jihadist foreign fighters converged on Syria from Saudi Arabia, Bahrain, Yemen, Kuwait, Tunisia, Libya, Egypt, Morocco, as well as from other Arab states, Chechnya, Pakistan, Afghanistan, and Western countries.

See also
 Arab Cold War
 Caucasus Emirate, a self-declared proto-state in Russia's North Caucasus
 Counter-jihad
 Defensive jihad
 Dominion theology
 International propagation of Salafism and Wahhabism (by region)
 Islam and war
 Islam and violence
 Holy war in Islam
 Islamic extremism
 Islamic fundamentalism
 Islamic terrorism
 Jihadist extremism in the United States
 Jihadist flag
 Qutbism
 Takfirism
 Islamism
 Post-Islamism
 List of Islamist terrorist attacks
 List of thwarted Islamist terrorist attacks
 Mujahideen
 Religious fanaticism in Islam
 Salafi movement
 International propagation of Salafism and Wahhabism (by region)
 Petro-Islam
 Salafi jihadism
 Wahhabism

Notes

References

Literature

*

External links

Islam-related controversies
Islamic fundamentalism
Islamic terrorism
Anti-communist terrorism
 
Mujahideen
Political neologisms
Religious terrorism